Chippy Renjith (credited as Shilpa in Kannada films) is an Indian actress and producer who works in the South Indian film industry, primarily in Malayalam and Kannada films. She has won several allocades including the Filmfare Award for Best Actress – Kannada & Karnataka State Film Award for Best Actress for her performance in Janumada Jodi (1996).

She has acted in many Kannada superhit films such as Bhoomi Thayiya Chochchala Maga (1998), Mungarina Minchu (1997) and Idhu Entha Premavayya (1999). Shilpa and Ramesh Aravind pair is considered as the one of the best onscreen pairs in Kannada cinema. Her best known works in Malayalam-language films include sister of Aadu Thoma (Mohanlal) in Spadikam and Chandradas's (Mammootty) estranged daughter in Patheyam.

She has also acted in several Malayalam TV series and her notable works include Sthreejanmam, Sthree oru Santhwanam, Sreeguruvayoorappan and Aakashadoothu. Currently, she plays the lead role in the superhit series Santhwanam.

Career 

Chippy made her film debut with the Bharathan directorial Padheyam in 1993, co-starring Mammootty. She has acted in several Malayalam films in supporting roles and a few lead roles. In 1995, she acted as the sister of the iconic goon Aadu Thoma in the film Spadikam starring Mohanlal.  Later she also acted in the 1996 Kannada film, Janumada Jodi, which broke many records in the Kannada film industry and screened for five hundred days. She received the Karnataka State Film Award for Best Actress award from the Government of Karnataka for her role portrayal in the same film establishing herself as a lead actress in the Kannada cinema. Post marriage she shifted her focus into Malayalam television serials. She played Mayamma in Sthreejanam. Later went on to act in several serials under her production house, Avanthika Creations.

She played the lead character in Vanambadi and reprised her role in the Tamil remake Mouna Raagam marking her debut in Tamil Television.

Personal life 

Chippy was born to Shaji and Thankam at Thiruvananthapuram, Kerala. Chippy has a sister, Drishya. She was educated at Nirmala Bhavan Higher Secondary School, Thiruvananthapuram and at Mar Ivanios College, Thiruvananthapuram.

Filmography

Malayalam

Kannada

Tamil 

 Dharma (1998), Geetha

Telugu 

 Pelli Peetalu (1998), Aswini

Television career 
As an actress

As a Judge
 Junior Idol (Jaihind)
 Comedy Stars (Asianet)
 Super Dancer Junior 5 (Amrita TV)
 Red Carpet (Amrita TV) – Mentor

As a Guest
 Flowers oru kodi
 Tharapakittu
 Thiranottam

As a Reality show contestant
 Ningalkkum Aakaam Kodeeshwaran – 2017

Awards

References

External links 
 

Living people
20th-century Indian actresses
21st-century Indian actresses
Actresses from Thiruvananthapuram
Actresses in Kannada cinema
Actresses in Malayalam cinema
Actresses in Malayalam television
Actresses in Tamil cinema
Actresses in Tamil television
Actresses in Telugu cinema
Indian film actresses
Indian television actresses
Year of birth missing (living people)
Tamil television producers